Neuroshima Hex! is a Polish tactical board game based on the Neuroshima role-playing game. It is published by Wydawnictwo Portal (Portal Publishing House). The game is set in the same post-apocalyptic world as its RPG counterpart.

Gameplay 

Neuroshima Hex is played on a hexagonal board. Each player periodically draws from a deck of hexagonal tiles. Tiles symbolize different types of military units. Annotations on the tiles denote the combat strength of each unit. Each player has one special tile called HQ (headquarters). Players take turns placing their tiles on the board. The player chooses:
 which tile from their hand to play,
 where to place the tile on the board, and
 what orientation the tile should have (Being hexagonal, there are six possible orientations for placing each tile.)
Normally, a tile does not move once placed on the board.

There are three major categories of tiles in each player's deck:
 One tile representing HQ. This is always drawn and placed on the board by each player first. Other than HQ, the remaining tiles are sorted randomly in the deck.
 Units (also called "soldiers") are tiles representing military units. Annotations on a unit tile denotes its combat strength:
 how much damage that unit inflicts on enemy units
 whether that damage can only be done to adjacent tiles ("melee attack" markings) or more distant tiles ("ranged attack") markings
 in what direction that damage takes place (annotations on multiple sides of the hexagon denote the ability to attack in multiple directions simultaneously)
 "toughness," meaning how much damage a unit can sustain before it is withdrawn from the playing board
 special abilities such as defense from ranged attack or the ability to prevent an enemy unit from attacking entirely (so-called "net" units)
 Modules are tiles that augment the abilities of adjacent tiles:
 increasing the strength of their attack
 increasing the range of their attack
 increasing their toughness (ability to withstand attacks)
 increasing the priority of their attack in the attack sequence of all the other tiles on the board (tiles take turns attacking one another based on another set of markings on each tile)
 healing damaged tiles
 allowing a tile to be relocated after being placed on the board

At the start of each player's turn, they draw three tiles at random from their deck. One tile must be discarded. The remaining two tiles may be placed on the board. Tiles cannot be placed on top of other tiles. The player may opt to discard more than one tile. Players take turns in this fashion until the board is partially populated with tiles.

Eventually, a player will draw a tile that allows the player to initiate combat. When this occurs, annotations on the tiles denote what priority each card has in the combat sequence. Tiles marked with a "3" get to attack first. Once the outcome of those attacks are resolved ("dead" units are removed from the board), then tiles marked with a "2" get to attack, and so on. Once all phases of combat (phases 3, 2, 1, and 0) have concluded, normal gameplay resumes.

The objective of the game is to reduce the enemy's HQ from 20 hit points to 0. Gameplay concludes when one HQ is down to 0 hit points, or when all the tiles have been exhausted from a player's deck. The winner is determined by the player's HQ that has the most remaining hit points.

The game offers four armies (denoted by four different color schemes for tiles), which differ in their strength, mobility, and flexibility, as denoted by differing annotations on each army's tiles. Normally, the game is played by two players, although three and four player variations exist.

Neuroshima Hex is essentially a much more complex version of War. In terms of strategy, Neuroshima Hex is similar to chess in that play emphasizes correct placement of pieces on the board, with occasional combat removing pieces from the board.

The game is also available as a video game, with rules essentially identical to the board game, albeit with combat between tiles automated via software.

Publication 

A second edition (in English) was released at SPIEL (the Essen game fair) in 2007, and a promotional 5th army (Doomsday Machine) was given to buyers at the Portal Publishing booth. At Pionek (a game convention in Gliwice, Poland) in 2007, a small supplement (Mad Bomber) was given out.

A French translation was released February 2008. In 2008, the game was published in English by Z-Man Games, with an expanded board and improved components; this edition includes the Mad Bomber and Mercenary tiles. Spanish, Italian, German and Dutch editions were released in 2010.

Three expansions for the second edition were released, so far only in Polish:
 Babel 13, in 2008
 Duel, in 2009
 Steel Police, in 2012

There are also several fan made expansions. Additional materials in multiple languages (inc. English-language translations of the expansions) are available at the relevant games articles at BoardGameGeek.

On 17 September 2010, the iOS version of the game was published on App Store, with an Android version following on 13 June 2012.

References

External links 

Official Neuroshima Hex! webpage  

French Neuroshima fanclub webpage 
Biggest fan Neuroshima Hex! webpage including fan projects and new armies 
New Fan Neuroshima Hex! webpage 
Neuroshima Hex iPhone Game
Neuroshima Hex Android Game

Board games introduced in 2006
Polish board games
Science fiction board games
Video games based on board games
IOS games
Post-apocalyptic games
Android (operating system) games